Enrique Araneda (11 November 1907 – 10 December 2001) was a Chilean footballer. He played in three matches for the Chile national football team in 1935. He was also part of Chile's squad for the 1935 South American Championship.

References

External links
 

1907 births
2001 deaths
Chilean footballers
Chile international footballers
Place of birth missing
Association football midfielders
Audax Italiano footballers